
Kabbalah, the central system in Jewish mysticism, uses anthropomorphic mythic symbols to metaphorically describe manifestations of God in Judaism. Based on the verses "God created man in his own image, in the image of God created he him; male and female created he them" (Genesis 1:27) and "from my flesh shall I see God" (Job 19:26), Kabbalah uses the form of the human body to describe the structure of the human soul, and the nature of supernal Divine emanations. A particular concern of Kabbalah is sexual unity between male and female potencies in Divinity on high, depicted as interaction of the two sides in the sephirot (Divine Anthropos), between archetypal partzufim (Divine personas), and the redemption of the exiled Shekhinah (feminine Divine Presence) from captivity among the impure forces below.

Kabbalists repeatedly warn and stress the need to divest their subtle notions from any corporeality, dualism, plurality, or spatial and temporal connotations. All divine emanations are only from the spiritual perception of creation, nullifying from the Divine view into the Ohr Ein Sof (Infinite light). As "the Torah speaks in the language of Man", the empirical terms are necessarily imposed upon man's experience in this world. Once the analogy is described, its dialectical limitations are then related to, stripping the kernel of its husk, to arrive at a truer conception. Nonetheless, Kabbalists believe their mythic symbols are not arbitrary, but carefully chosen terminologies that mystically point beyond their own limits of language to denote subtle connotations and profound relationships in the Divine spiritual influences. More accurately, as they describe the emanation of the Material world from the Spiritual realms, the analogous anthropomorphisms and material metaphors themselves derive through cause and effect from their precise root analogies on High.

Due to the danger of idolatrous material analogy, Kabbalists historically restricted esoteric oral transmission to close circles, with pure motives, advanced learning and elite preparation. At various times in history, however, they sought wide public dissemination for Kabbalistic mysticism or popular ethical literature based on Kabbalah, to further Messianic preparation. Understanding Kabbalah through its unity with mainstream Talmudic, Halachic and philosophical proficiency was a traditional prerequisite to avert fallacies. Rabbinic Kabbalists attributed the 17th-18th century Sabbatean antinomian mystical heresies to false corporeal interpretations of Kabbalah through impure motives. Later Hasidic thought saw its devotional popularisation of Kabbalah as a safeguard against esoteric corporeality, by its internalisation of Jewish mysticism through the psychological spiritual experience of man.

Background
Talmudic era classic Rabbinic Judaism of the early centuries CE comprised legal Halakha, and imaginative theological and narrative Aggada. Alongside references to early Rabbinic Jewish mysticism, unsystematised philosophical thought was expressed in the Aggada, as well as highly anthropomorphic narrative depictions accentuating the Personal God of the Hebrew Bible in vivid loving relationship with the Jewish people in Rabbinic Judaism. Among such visual metaphors in the Talmud and Midrash, God is said to wear Tefillin, embody the lover seeking for Israel's bride in the Song of Songs, suffer with Israel's suffering, accompany them in exile as the Shekhina Divine Presence, appear as a warrior at the Reed Sea and a wise elder at Sinai. Jacob Neusner shows the chronologically developing anthropomorphism in classic Rabbinic literature, culminating in the personal, poetically embodied, relational, familiar "God we know and love" in the Babylonian Talmud. Gershom Scholem describes the Aggadah as "Giving original expression to the deepest motive-powers of the religious Jew, a quality which helps to make it an excellent and genuine approach to the essentials of Judaism"

The Middle Ages saw the development of systematic theology in Judaism in Jewish philosophy and in Kabbalah, both reinterpreting classic rabbinic Aggadah according to their differing views of metaphysics. Kabbalah emerged in the 12th-14th centuries parallel to, and soon after, the rationalist tradition in Medieval Jewish philosophy. Maimonides articulated normative Jewish theology in his philosophical stress against any idolatrous corporeal interpretation of references to God in the Hebrew Bible and Rabbinic literature, encapsulated in his 3rd principle of faith and legal codification of Monotheism. He formulated the philosophical transcendence of God through negative theology, allegorising all anthropomorphic references as metaphors of action, and polemicising against literal interpretation of imaginative myth. Kabbalists accepted the Hidden Godhead, reinterpreting it in mystical experience and speculation as the transcendent Ayin "Nothing". However, seeking the personal living God of the Hebrew Bible and classic rabbinic Aggadah imagination, they formulated an opposite approach, articulating an inner dynamic life among Divine immanent theosophical emanations in the spiritual realms. These involved Medieval Zoharic notions of Divine attributes and male–female powers, recast in 16th century Lurianism as cosmic withdrawal, exile–redemption and Divine personas. Lurianic Kabbalah further emphasised the need to divest its heightened personification from corporeality, while lending its messianic mysticism to popular social appeal which became dominant in early-modern Judaism.

The metaphor of sexuality in Kabbalah 

The knowledge of the Five Worlds and of God prevails over that of sexuality as merely expressed in Halakhah when necessary to teach Jewish rules: the Kabbalah about it is explained by both Isaac Luria and Chaim Vital, obviously with reference to the wisdom about the Sefirot and the Partzufim. Apart from the cases of Abba, Imma, Zeir Anpin and Nukva or Arik Anpin and Atik Yomim, all the dictates expressed on the Sefirot they can also refer to sexuality in detail, in fact, the male waters and female waters are often discussed, based on the bond between man and woman to return to the archetypes divine: as it is written in the texts of Kabbalah, it is therefore true that sexuality or its symbolic theories are useful for understanding even divine attributes or modalities, at first by the Kabbalistic wisdom tradition of Chassadim and Ghevurot.

As regards the verse of the Song of Songs She kisses me with the kisses of her mouth, the reciprocal interchange is indicated as well as the union of pleasures, sighs and therefore of the spirit and soul of male and female, as mentioned: they are the joining of spirit with spirit, and  four spirits called Love. Since they are four spirits, it might be explained that it is like what has been written, that his kiss includes two spirits that come form the Chochmah and Binah within him, and her kiss includes two spirits that come from the pairing of Chochmah and Binah within her. But this is not the meaning of this statement, because the two spirits of his and her Chochmah and Binah are not considered to be two spirits, rather only one. In fact, in Kabbalah it is explained that there are different levels of soul including Nefesh, Ruach and Neshamah; it is also known that, in addition to the "union of bodies of male and female", the two souls are as if united during the relationship so that the doubt ensues with respect to which parts are to be considered, given among other things that there are also different modalities and points to be consider again, for example the Neshikin of the kiss and the others, "bSod Yesod-Yesod"; Kabbalah analyzes all the phases of desire and pleasure up to the realized love and beyond, that is, its successive moments concluding that there is a modality in which, as mentioned above, the final kiss arouses Neshikin again in his throat and in her throat as well as in the male chest and in the female chest. Chaim Vital explains all this and more, now inherited as a disciple of Isaac Luria.

See also

Notes

General references
 Mystical Concepts in Chassidism: An Introduction to Kabbalistic Concepts and Doctrines, Jacob Immanuel Schochet, Kehot 1998. Also printed at back of bilingual English Tanya. Chapter 1: Anthropomorphism and metaphors

External links
 True Monotheism Kabbalistic understanding of the absolute Unity of Divine manifestations, from inner.org

Anthropomorphism
Jewish theology
Kabbalah
Sephirot